The Tapajós is a tributary of the Amazon River in Brazil.

Tapajós may also refer to:

Tapajós (proposed Brazilian state)
Tapajós Futebol Clube, a Brazilian association football team in Santarém, Pará
Tapajós National Forest in the Brazilian state of Pará
Tapajós people, an indigenous people of Brazil during the 17th century
Tapajós languages, a group of languages